The men's 10 metre platform competition at the 2015 European Games in Baku took place on 21 June at the Baku Aquatics Centre.

Results
The preliminary round was started at 13:04. The final was held at 20:17.

Green denotes finalists

References

Men's 10 metre platform